The 2012 Hun Sen Cup was the 6th season of the Hun Sen Cup, the premier knockout tournament for association football clubs in Cambodia. The reigning champions were Preah Khan Reach, after they won their first title last season. Preah Khan Reach successfully defended their title, beating Nagacorp FC in the final.

Qualifying round

Group stage 
16 teams entered the group stage, including 9 of the 10 Cambodian League teams. 16 teams were divided into 4 groups of four. The top two teams in each group advanced to the quarter-finals after which the tournament continued in the traditional knockout format.

Group A

Source: Soccerway

Group B

Source: Soccerway

Group C

Source: Soccerway

Group D

Source: Soccerway

Quarter-finals
The top two teams from each group advanced to this stage, where all four group winners were drawn at home.

Semifinals

3rd place play-off

Final

Awards
 Top goal scorer (The golden boot): Khoun Laboravy of Preah Khan Reach (22 goals)
 Goalkeeper of the season (The golden glove): Sor Sophea of Preah Khan Reach
 Fair Play: Nagacorp FC

See also
 2012 Cambodian League
 Cambodian League
 Hun Sen Cup

References

Hun Sen Cup seasons
Hun
2012 domestic association football cups